James Davison Fellers (April 17, 1913 – April 3, 1997) founded the law firm of Fellers Snider in Oklahoma City in 1963.  Fellers served as the President of the Oklahoma Bar Association in 1964, and president of the American Bar Association from 1974 to 1975.

References

External links
Fellers Snider

1913 births
1997 deaths
Lawyers from Oklahoma City
University of Oklahoma alumni
Presidents of the American Bar Association
20th-century American lawyers